The Herrmann Radteam is a German UCI Continental road bicycle racing team. The team registered with the UCI in 2019.

Team roster

National Champions
2019
 Germany Under-23 Time Trial, Miguel Heidemann

References

Cycling teams established in 2019